The Roman Catholic Diocese of Parramatta is a suffragan Latin Church diocese of the Archdiocese of Sydney, established in 1986.

The Diocese of Parramatta is an organisation of the Roman Catholic Church, with responsibility for the western suburbs of Sydney and the Blue Mountains, in New South Wales, Australia.

St Patrick's Cathedral, Parramatta, is the seat of the Catholic Bishop of Parramatta. On 5 May 2016, Pope Francis appointed Vincent Long Van Nguyen OFM Conv to be its fourth bishop. His installation took place on 16 June 2016.

History
The diocese is located in one of the fastest-growing areas of New South Wales. The diocese was established 8 April 1986 from the western part of the Archdiocese of Sydney. and by 2004 served 307,392 parishioners out of a total population of 924,621.

Bishops

Bishops of Parramatta
The following prelates have served as Bishop of Parramatta:
{| class="wikitable"
!Order
!Name
!Date enthroned
!Reign ended
!Term of office
!Reason for term end
|-
|align="center"| ||Bede Vincent Heather ||align="center" | 8 April 1986 ||align="center" |10 July 1997 ||align="right"| ||Resigned; Bishop Emeritus of Parramatta. Resides on the Central Coast.
|-
|align="center"| ||Kevin Michael Manning ||align="center" |10 July 1997 ||align="center"|8 January 2010 ||align="right"| ||Retired; Bishop Emeritus of Parramatta.
|-
|align="center"| ||Anthony Fisher,  ||align="center" |8 January 2010 ||align="center"|12 November 2014 ||align="right"| ||Appointed Archbishop of Sydney
|-
|align="center"| ||Vincent Long Van Nguyen,  ||align="center" |16 June 2016 ||align="center"| ||align="right"| ||
|-
|}

Other priest of this diocese who became bishop
Robert Michael McGuckin, appointed Bishop of Toowoomba in 2012

Cathedral

With origins of the first Mass occurring on the present day site of the cathedral going back to 1803, St Patrick's was extensively rebuilt after a 1996 fire devastated the original church established in 1854. A tower was built on the original St Patrick's Church, which was consecrated in 1880 and blessed in 1883. A cast bronze bell was installed in the tower in 1904. As the needs of the parish grew, a new church was built on the site in 1936, incorporating the existing tower and spire. When the Diocese of Parramatta was established in 1986, St Patrick's Church was designated as St Patrick's Cathedral. The fire of 1996 completely devastated the cathedral, leaving only the bell tower and sandstone walls. A completely new cathedral was rebuilt adjacent to the historic fire ravaged site. Designed in consultation with Romaldo Giurgola, the new cathedral, completed in 2003, has won the Sir Zelman Cowen Award for Public Buildings from the Australian Institute of Architects.

Parishes
There are 47 parishes and one parochial district located in Diocese of Parramatta within five deaneries.

Central Deanery
Blacktown – Mary, Queen of the Family Parish
Doonside – St John Vianney Parish
Greystanes – Our Lady Queen of Peace Parish
Lalor Park – St Bernadette's Parish
Marayong – St Andrew's Parish
Plumpton – The Good Shepherd Parish
Quakers Hill-Schofields – Mary Immaculate Parish
Rooty Hill – St Aidan's Parish
Seven Hills – Our Lady of Lourdes Parish
Toongabbie – St Anthony of Padua Parish
Wentworthville – Our Lady of Mt Carmel Parish

Blue Mountains Deanery
Blackheath - Sacred Heart Parish
Emu Plains - Our Lady of the Way Parish
Glenbrook - St Finbar's Parish
Lawson - Our Lady of the Nativity Parish
Springwood - St Thomas Aquinas Parish
Upper Blue Mountains - St Mary of the Cross Mackillop Parish

Northern Deanery
Baulkham Hills – St Michael's Parish
Castle Hill – St Bernadette's Parish
Glenwood-Stanhope Gardens – St John XXIII Parish
Kellyville – Our Lady of The Rosary Parish
Kenthurst – St Madeleine Sophie Barat Parish
North Rocks – Christ the King Parish
Rouse Hill – Our Lady of the Angels Parish
Winston Hills – St Paul the Apostle Parish

Eastern Deanery
Dundas Valley – St Bernadette's Parish
Granville – Holy Trinity Parish
Granville East – Holy Family Parish
Guildford – St Patrick's Parish
Harris Park – St Oliver Plunkett's Parish
Merrylands – St Margaret Mary's Parish
Parramatta – St Patrick's Cathedral Parish
Parramatta North – St Monica's Parish
Rydalmere – Holy Name of Mary Parish
Westmead – Sacred Heart Parish

Western Deanery
Cranebrook – Corpus Christi Parish
Glenmore Park – Padre Pio Parish
Kingswood – St Joseph's Parish
Luddenham-Warragamba – Sacred Heart Parish
Mt Druitt – Holy Family Parish
Mt Druitt South – Sacred Heart Parish
Penrith – St Nicholas of Myra Parish
Richmond – St Monica's Parish
Riverstone – St John the Evangelist Parish
St Clair – Holy Spirit Parish
St Marys – Our Lady of the Rosary Parish
Windsor – St Matthew's Parish

Undefined
Marsden Park - St Luke's Catholic Faith Community (Parochial District)

See also

 Roman Catholicism in Australia
 Catholic education in the Diocese of Parramatta
 St Andrew's Parish

References

External links
Catholic Diocese of Parramatta

 
Parramatta, Roman Catholic Diocese of
Parramatta
Parramatta
Parramatta